Robert Norgate,  D.D. (died 1587) was an English priest and academic in the second half of the sixteenth century.

Norgate was born in Aylsham. He was educated at Corpus Christi College, Cambridge, graduating B.A. in 1565; MA in 1568; and B.D. in 1575. He was appointed Fellow in 1567; and Master in 1573. He was Vice-Chancellor of the University of Cambridge from 1584 to 1585. He held livings at Forncett and Little Gransden. He died at the Master's Lodge on 2 November 1587.

References 

Alumni of Corpus Christi College, Cambridge
Fellows of Corpus Christi College, Cambridge
Masters of Corpus Christi College, Cambridge
16th-century English Anglican priests
1587 deaths
People from Aylsham
Vice-Chancellors of the University of Cambridge